The Socialist Federal Republic of Yugoslavia was the host nation for the 1984 Winter Olympics in Sarajevo.  Prior to these Games, Yugoslavia had never won a medal at the Winter Games, but Jure Franko won a silver medal in the men's giant slalom to become a national hero.

Medalists

Alpine skiing

Men

Women

Biathlon

Bobsleigh

Cross-country skiing

Men

Women

Figure skating

Men

Women

Ice hockey

Group A
Top two teams (shaded ones) advanced to the medal round.

West Germany 8-1 Yugoslavia
Sweden 11-0 Yugoslavia
USSR 9-1 Yugoslavia
Yugoslavia 5-1 Italy
Poland 8-1 Yugoslavia

Roster
 Igor Beribak
 Mustafa Bešić
 Dejan Burnik
 Marjan Gorenc
 Edo Hafner
 Gorazd Hiti
 Drago Horvat
 Peter Klemenc
 Jože Kovač
 Vojko Lajovec
 Tomaž Lepša
 Blaž Lomovšek
 Drago Mlinarec
 Murajica Pajić
 Cveto Pretnar
 Bojan Razpet
 Ivan Ščap
 Matjaž Sekelj
 Zvone Šuvak
 Andrzej Vidmar
 Domine Lomovšek

Luge

Men

Women

Nordic combined 

Events:
 normal hill ski jumping (Three jumps, best two counted and shown here.)
 15 km cross-country skiing

Ski jumping

Speed skating

Men

Women

References

Official Olympic Reports
International Olympic Committee results database
Serbian Olympic Committee
 Olympic Winter Games 1984, full results by sports-reference.com

Nations at the 1984 Winter Olympics
1984
Winter Olympics